Allison Magdalene George (born January 3, 1988) is a Grenadian sprinter, who specialized in the 200 metres. She set a personal best time of 22.72 seconds, by finishing fourth at the 2008 Big 12 Outdoor Track and Field Championships in Boulder, Colorado.

George represented Grenada at the 2008 Summer Olympics in Beijing, where she competed for the women's 200 metres. She ran in the sixth and final heat against seven other athletes, including Jamaica's Sherone Simpson and LaVerne Jones-Ferrette of the Virgin Islands, both of whom were heavy favorites in this event. She finished the race in sixth place by two hundredths of a second (0.02) behind Brazil's Evelyn dos Santos, with a time of 23.45 seconds. Although she was ranked below four qualifying places, George advanced into the next round of the competition, based on her performance in the heats. George, however, fell short in her bid for the semi-finals, as she placed eighth in the fourth heat of the quarterfinal round, with a time of 23.77 seconds.

George is also a member of the track and field team for the Texas A&M Aggies, and a graduate of leadership, minor in sociology and English, at the Texas A&M University in College Station, Texas.

References

External links

Profile – Texas A&M Aggies
NBC Olympics Profile

Grenadian female sprinters
Living people
Olympic athletes of Grenada
Athletes (track and field) at the 2008 Summer Olympics
Texas A&M University alumni
Texas A&M Aggies women's track and field athletes
1988 births
People from Saint Andrew Parish, Grenada
Olympic female sprinters